In mathematics, the Kolmogorov integral (or Kolmogoroff integral) is a generalized  integral introduced by  including the Lebesgue–Stieltjes integral, the Burkill integral, and  the Hellinger integral as special cases.  The integral is a limit over a directed family of partitions, when the resulting limiting value is independent of the tags of each partition segment.

References

Definitions of mathematical integration